Carin Elisa da Silva (born 16 November 1984) is a Swedish-Portuguese singer, professional dancer and television presenter.

Biography
Carin da Silva are a three-times Swedish junior champion in Latin American dance, standarddance and ballroom dancing. She represented Sweden both in the European and World Championships in dancing. She studied at Kongahällagymnasiet in Kungälv and Balettakademien in Gothenburg.

Between 2005 and 2006, she was a member of the music group Cosmo4 and the group released the music singles Peek-A-Boo and Adios Amigos while she was still a member.

She has participated in the TV4 celebrity dancing show Let's Dance three years in a row. In 2006 she danced with celebrity Viktor Åkerblom Nilsson, where she finished in third place. In the 2007 season she danced with Patrick Ekwall and placed ninth. In 2008 she participated with Mats Carlsson where she placed fifth.

In July 2008, she worked as a program announcer for TV4 and also at TV4 Plus. She was chosen as "Sweden's sexiest woman" by the magazine QX in February of the same year. In late 2009 she presented Förkväll at TV4.

In September 2011 she was the sidekick of Adam Alsing in his talk show #AdamLive along with Daniel Breitholtz. The show aired for two seasons on TV3. In 2013, Carin da Silva and Adam Alsing presented Kändishoppet at TV3. In 2020, da Silva participated in SVTs show Bäst i test.

Musical and theater
2005 Häxjakten – Teater Thalia
2005 Journey – Teater Thalia
2006 Fifteen Minutes of Fame – Scen Österlen

TV and film
2004 Orka! Orka!
2005 Sandor slash Ida
2006 Let's Dance
2007 Let's Dance
2008 Let's Dance
2009 Förkväll
2011 #AdamLive
2013 Kändishoppet
2020 Bäst i test

Discography

Music singles
2006 – Peek-A-Boo (with Cosmo4)
2006 – Adios Amigos (with Cosmo4)

References

External links
Official site

Swedish television personalities
Swedish women television presenters
Swedish people of Portuguese descent
Swedish female dancers
1984 births
Living people
Singers from Gothenburg
Balettakademien
21st-century Swedish singers
21st-century Swedish women singers